Chunhyangga is the most famous pansori (musical story telling) in Korea, having had considerable popularity for the past century. Chunhyangga is considered to be the best pansori musically, and as a work of literature and play.

Chunhyangga tells the story of love between Chunhyang (춘향), the daughter of a kisaeng entertainer, and Yi Mongryong (이 몽룡), the son of a magistrate.  After the two are illegally married, Mongryong goes to Seoul and a corrupt local magistrate, Byeon the vicious (변학도), attempts to force Chunhyang to be his concubine.  She refuses and is faced with death, but is rescued at the last minute by Mongryong returning in his new role as a secret royal inspector. The story is set in Namwon, in Jeolla province, where an annual Chunhyang Festival is held.

There are no records confirming the exact time when Chunhyangga was written. Chunhyangga can be found in Manwhajip written by Yu Jin-han during the Joseon Dynasty, as well as in Mugeukhangrok of the same era written by Juik-Yang. Therefore, it supposed that Chunhyangga has existed since before Sukjong of Joseon (1661–1720).

The Chunhyangga is not only a story about a woman of chaste reputation, but also about resistance to the aristocracy. The story stars Chunhyang, the daughter of a gisaeng (female entertainer), who becomes the wife of a district magistrate. This indicates that the story's writer denied the status system. In Chunhyangga one can find an expression of the common people's wish for truth and human freedom.

The story has various scenes: one is peaceful, one sad, one humorous, and one serious. The music changes with the scene, story and themes. The diverse pansori singers who have performed it over time have contributed famous deoneum (new section to musical story), so it is valuable musically and historically.

Chunhyangga is the longest among the five pansoris. In 1969, pansori master singer Park Dong-jin sang Chunhyangga for eight hours (surprising his audience). The original version of Chunhyangga was not that long, but has been greatly developed over time. The singers of pansori added new techniques, melodies and stories to Chunhyangga.

Chunhyangga is one of the five surviving stories of the Korean pansori musical storytelling tradition.   The other stories are Simcheongga, Heungbuga, Jeokbyeokga and Sugungga.  Although based on older traditional songs, it was composed in its present form in the 1870s by the pansori writer Shin Jae-hyo.

Plot
The Chunhyangga is composed of seven parts:
 Yi Mongryong and Chunhyang's first meeting at Gwang Hanru.
 Mongryong and Chunhyang's love.
 Mongryong and Chunhyang's parting.
 Byeon's tyranny and Chunhyang's imprisonment.
 Mongryong wins first place in a state examination and meets Chunhyang again.
 Byeon is punished and Mongryong and Chunhyang live a long and happy life.
 Mongyong is married to Chunhyang.

Godae Soseol
Chunhyangjeon (hangul: 춘향전; hanja: 春香傳) is a godae soseol (hangul: 고대 소설; hanja: 古代小說, an ancient story) based on Chunhyangga.

Modern adaptations

The story has been made into films over a dozen times, most recently as Im Kwon-taek's Chunhyang in 2000.  It was also the basis of the successful Korean romantic comedy series Delightful Girl Choon-Hyang.

It has also been converted to a successful children's musical, performed in English by Theater Seoul entirely by children and youth.  This show has been brought to the Edinburgh Fringe Festival twice, once to the Underbelly (2006) and once to C venues (2007).

Legend of Chun Hyang, a manga by Clamp, is loosely based on this story.

Sugar Rush Ride, a single by South Korean boy band Tomorrow x Together (Big Hit Music, 2023) borrows some of its lyrics from Chunhyangga.

See also 
 Korean folklore
 Korean literature
 Korean music
Pansori
Pansori gosu
Culture of Korea

References

External links 
 The Ch'unhyang Story - from Instrok.org, created by East Rock Institute
 National Changguk Company of Korea

 
Pansori
Korean folklore